Jelenča is one of the boroughs of Šabac City in the Mačva District of Serbia. The borough has a Serb ethnic majority.  In the 2002 census, its population was found to be 1,803 people.

See also
List of places in Serbia
Mačva

Mačva
Šabac
Populated places in Mačva District